Deadwind is a Finnish crime drama and Nordic noir television series directed and created by Rike Jokela, starring Pihla Viitala, Lauri Tilkanen, Jani Volanen, and Tommi Korpela. It premiered in Finland in March 2018 on Yle TV2 and in August 2018 on Netflix. The show follows Sofia Karppi, a detective of the Finnish police who is recently widowed in her 30s with two children. She returns to police work in Helsinki, and her first case is the murder of Anna Bergdahl, a social affairs consultant.

Season 1 received strong reviews after airing in Finland and was compared to the Danish The Killing and to the Danish-Swedish The Bridge. Season 2 of the show premiered on Yle TV on April 5, 2020 and was added to Netflix on July 1, 2020. Season 3 of the show premiered on Yle TV on October 29, 2021. Netflix has announced October 29, 2022, as its release date for the third season.

Synopsis
Sofia Karppi (Pihla Viitala) returns to her work as a homicide detective in the Helsinki Police Department while taking care of two children after the accidental death of her husband. Rookie detective Sakari Nurmi (Lauri Tilkanen) is transferred from the financial crime unit to the homicide unit as Karppi's partner. Their first case begins as a routine disappearance.

Women's clothes found at a construction site lead the detectives to the body of social affairs consultant Anna Bergdahl (Pamela Tola) — buried with flowers in her hands at a shore belonging to wind power research firm Tempo. Anna has been murdered, and her husband, Usko Bergdahl (Jani Volanen), is confused after hearing about the incident. Karppi and Nurmi start investigating Anna's background, such as her job with the Tempo company and its critical construction project.

Cast

Pihla Viitala as Sofia Karppi
Lauri Tilkanen as Sakari Nurmi
Jani Volanen as Usko Bergdahl
Pamela Tola as Anna Bergdahl
Eedit Patrakka as Armi Bergdahl
Elsa Brotherus as Isla Bergdahl
Tommi Korpela as Alex Hoikkala
Pirjo Lonka as Julia Hoikkala
Riku Nieminen as Roope Hoikkala
Jonna Järnefelt as Linda Hoikkala
Raimo Grönberg as Tapio Koskimäki
Mimosa Willamo as Henna Honkasuo
Noa Tola as Emil Karppi
Mikko Nousiainen as Jarkko Vaahtera
Marjaana Maijala as Maria Litma
Tobias Zilliacus as Rannikko
August Wittgenstein as Andreas Wolf
Ville Myllyrinne as JP
Vera Kiiskinen as Raisa Peltola
Kari Hietalahti as Louhivuori
Antti Virmavirta as Lennart
Ylermi Rajamaa as Kiiski
Antti Reini as Stig Olander
Eero Ritala as Leo Rastas
Jemina Sillanpää as Laura
Alina Tomnikov as Iiris
Sulevi Peltola as Tuomas
Lilga Kovanko as Saara
Juhani Niemelä as Paavali Pusenius
Eero Milonoff as Jyränkoski
Minna Suuronen as Arjatsalo
Rabbe Smedlund as Fredrik Hoikkala
Manuela Bosco as Filippa

Episodes

Season 1 (2018)

Season 2 (2020)

Season 3 (2021) 
The third season aired in Finland from late October 2021. The season starts after Karppi has been on one year of leave for obfuscating her daughter's drug smuggling. The two detectives will be pursuing a brutal murderer who leaves an odd symbol on their victims. Over the course of the murder investigation, Karppi begins to unravel that her husband's death may not have been an accident – but a crime.

Production 
The series was co-written by director Rike Jokela with Jari Olavi Rantala and Kirsi Porkka. 

Deadwind is produced for Yle by Dionysos Films' Producers Riina Hyytiä and Pauliina Ståhlberg, and co-produced by the German company H&V Production.

Release
Deadwind season 1 premiered in Finland in spring 2018 on Yle TV2 and in the autumn on Netflix. Season 2 was shown by Yleisradio and Netflix in 2020, and Season 3 aired from October 2021.

Reception 
Season 1 of Deadwind received strong reviews and ratings in Finland after it aired on Yle TV2. It was compared to the Danish crime series The Killing and was nominated at the 2018 Nordisk Film & TV Fond Prize in the Best Nordic Screenplay category. Noel Murray of The Verge described the series as "realistically grim, but also offers the simple satisfaction of watching smart professionals bring some order to a chaotic world, one case at a time."

Bustle magazine's Rebecca Patton compared the show, for example, to the Danish-Swedish The Bridge series. She summarized, Deadwind is "just as compelling and addictive as its predecessors. After all, no one does brooding crime shows like the Scandinavians."

See also 
 Arctic Circle (TV series)
 Bordertown (Finnish TV series)
 Cinema of Finland

References

External links
 
 
 Dionysos Films

Finnish drama television series
Finnish police procedural television series
Television shows set in Finland
2010s Finnish television series
2018 Finnish television series debuts
Yle original programming